Karel, Me and You (Czech: Karel, já a ty) is a 2019 Czech comedy drama film directed by Bohdan Karásek. It stars Jenovéfa Boková, Miroslav Faderholz and  Miloslav König. It premiered at 54th Karlovy Vary International Film Festival.

Cast
 Jenovéfa Boková as Saša
 Miroslav Faderholz as Dušan
 Miloslav König as Karel

References

External links
 
 Karel, Me and You at CSFD.cz 

2019 films
Czech comedy films
Czech drama films
2010s Czech-language films
2010s thriller films
2019 comedy films